Leucatomis is a monotypic moth genus of the family Noctuidae. Its only species, Leucatomis incondita, is found in French Guiana. Both the genus and species were first described by Paul Dognin in 1914.

References

Herminiinae
Monotypic moth genera